Giovanni Paganin (born 28 April 1955) is an Italian speed skater. He competed in two events at the 1980 Winter Olympics.

References

External links
 

1955 births
Living people
Italian male speed skaters
Olympic speed skaters of Italy
Speed skaters at the 1980 Winter Olympics
People from Asiago
Sportspeople from the Province of Vicenza